Grayscale Investments is an American digital currency asset management company and subsidiary of Digital Currency Group founded in 2013 and based in Stamford, Connecticut

History
Grayscale was founded in 2013, launching a bitcoin trust that year. In 2015, the company became a subsidiary of Digital Currency Group. The same year, Grayscale Bitcoin Trust began trading over-the-counter on the OTCQX market, becoming the first publicly traded bitcoin fund in the United States. The company charged higher than average fees compared to similar exchange-traded funds (ETFs), but said the fees were to cover the costs of trading bitcoin. Grayscale sought to turn GBTC into an ETF in 2017, but voluntarily withdrew the application following negative remarks from the SEC.

In 2017, Grayscale launched two additional cryptocurrency investment funds which held Ethereum Classic and Zcash. The following year, the company launched its fourth cryptocurrency fund, the Digital Large Cap Fund (GDLC), initially holding bitcoin, Ether, Litecoin, Ripple, and Bitcoin Cash. GDLC began trading publicly in October 2019. GBTC became an SEC-reporting bitcoin investment fund in 2020. As such, it files publicly available financial disclosure forms, including the quarterly Form 10-Q and annual Form 10-K.

In 2021, the company added Grayscale Solana Trust to its portfolio, the 16th such fund it manages.

In 2021, the company was said to manage more than $50 billion in assets.

In 2022, Grayscale launched an ETF traded on American, British, Italian, and German exchanges that tracks the Bloomberg Grayscale Future of Finance Index, consisting of a blend of companies, including asset managers, exchanges, brokerages, and cryptocurrency miners. In June 2022, the SEC denied Grayscale's request to turn GBTC into an exchange-traded fund, citing concerns about the lack of oversight over cryptocurrencies and the risk of price fixing. The denial prompted Grayscale to sue the agency.

As of November 2022, the Grayscale Bitcoin Trust holds one of the largest shares of bitcoin (BTC), with 643,572 BTC, worth about $10.6 billion, approximately 3% of all Bitcoin currently available.

Contagion from FTX bankruptcy 
When the Bahamas-based cryptocurrency exchange FTX filed for bankruptcy in November 2022, the Financial Times reported that investors in the trust "have suffered an 83 per cent loss since bitcoin peaked in November 2021." Grayscale Bitcoin Trust declined by 20% over the two weeks preceding November 17. It was trading at a discounted price, 42% below the value of its Bitcoin, as of November 14.

References

External links

Asset management
2013 establishments in the United States
Organizations based in Connecticut
Organizations based in Stamford, Connecticut